Kongu Chera dynasty, or Cheras of Kongu or Karur, or simply as the Chera dynasty, were a medieval royal lineage in south India, initially ruling over western Tamil Nadu and central Kerala. The headquarters of the Kongu Cheras was located at Karur-Vanchi (Karur) in central Tamil Nadu. The Chera rulers of Kongu were subordinate to or conquered by Pallava, Pandya and Chola rulers are also said to have overrun the Kongu Chera country.

Present-day central Kerala detached from Kongu Chera kingdom around 8th-9th century AD to form the Chera Perumal kingdom (fl. 9th – 12th century AD). The exact relationship between the two branches of the Chera family is not known to scholars. The Nambutiris asked for a regent of the Chera king from Karur in Coimbatore and were granted the prime minister hailing from Pundurai. Hence the Zamorin holds the title 'Punthurakkon' (King from Punthura). After this, the Malabar and Kerala parts became autonomous of Karur.

The Kongu Cheras are often described as the members of Chandra-Aditya Kula (the Luni-Solar Race) (around 9th-11th centuries). Kongu Cheras appear to have been absorbed into the Pandya political system by 10th-11th century AD. A collateral branch of the Kongu Cheras, known as "Kongu Cholas", later ruled the Kongu country under the Cholas.

Political history 
Corrections by M. G. S. Narayanan (1972) on K. A. Nilakanta Sastri (1955) and Elamkulam P. N. Kunjan Pillai are employed.

Kongu Cheras of Karur initially appear as the rulers of western Tamil Nadu and central Kerala in the medieval period. The family claimed that they were descended from the Cheras who flourished in pre-Pallava (early historic) south India. It is likely that the Cheras had a system of joint rule with each prince from the family ruling in a different province (Karuvur-Vanchi, Muchiri-Vanchi or Thondi). An inscription of Kadamba king Vishnu Varma, dated 5th or 6th century, can be found at Edakkal cave in Wayanad. An early historic Chera graffiti containing the phrase "Kadummi Putra Chera" was also discovered from the cave.

The earliest Chalukya king to claim overlordship over Chera/Kerala is Kirttivarman I (fl. 566 - 598 AD) (this claim is generally considered as a "boastfull exaggeration" by historians). A later grant (695 AD) of king Vinayaditya II Satyasraya, with reference to the vassalage of the Kerala country, is now reckoned as a more dependable record. Several Chalukya records of the 7th and 8th centuries speak of the conquest and vassalage of the Kerala country. A number of Pallava records also mention the vassalage of the Kerala/Chera country.

By the beginning of early medieval period, Karur (in interior Tamil Nadu) had acquired much prominence with respect to the other two centers, Muchiri-Vanchi and Thondi (both in Kerala). Karur came to be known by the 8th – 9th centuries AD as "Vanchi manakaramana Karur". There was a domination of present-day Kerala regions of the old Chera country by the Kongu Cheras of Karur (probably via some form of viceregal rule).

Cheras as Pandya vassals 
There are clear attestations of repeated Pandya conquests of the Kerala country in the 7th and 8th centuries AD. Pandya king Sendan was known as the "Vanavan", an ancient name for the Chera king. Arikesari Maravarman, another Pandya ruler, probably defeated the Cheras on several occasions. His successor Ko Chadayan Ranadhira also made gains against the Cheras.

The so-called "renewal of the capital city of Vanchi (Karur) along with Kudal (Madurai) and Kozhi (Uraiyur)" by the Pandya king Rajasimha I (730 – 65 AD), described in the Madras Museum Plates of Jatila Parantaka Nedunjadaiyan Varaguna (765 – 815 AD), may suggest a Pandya occupation of the Kongu Chera capital Karur. It is known that when Jatila Parantaka went to war against the Adigaman of Tagadur (Dharmapuri), the Keralas and the Pallavas went to the aid of the latter though "the Pandyas drove them back to the quarters from which they had emerged" (Madras Museum Plates of Jatila Parantaka, 17th year). Perhaps the Chera branch from present-day Kerala had crossed the Western Ghat Mountains to offer support to the Adigaman and after defeat they were pursued up to the Palghat Gap by the Pandya forces.

Rashtrakuta inscriptions mention "an alliance of Dravida kings including Chera, Pandya, Chola and Pallava" (E. I., XVIII).

Detachment of central Kerala 

The ancient Chera country, except central Kerala, gradually passed into the Pandya sphere of influence. The western portions of the Chera country became, slowly but surely, an independent kingdom, the Chera Perumal kingdom, with its own headquarters at Makotai (Kodungallur). The branch of Chera family survived in Kongu country, now Pandya vassals, are described in later inscriptions (9th-11th centuries) as members of Chandra-Aditya Kula (the Luni-Solar Race). This seems to suggest a process of integration with the Pandya royal family (the Lunar Race) via royal marriages.

The two branches of the Chera family, the Kongu Cheras and the Chera Perumals, supported by the Pandyas and the Cholas respectively, were rivals in this period. Chera Perumal king Sthanu Ravi was a junior partner in a Chola campaign in the Kongu country. The Pandyas are known to have made a defensive alliance with the Cheras of Kongu country (who were under their influence) in this period. Pandya king Parantaka Vira Narayana (c. 880 – 900 AD) is known to have married a Chera (Kongu Chera) princess "Vanavan Maha Devi". Rajasimha II, son of this alliance, is described as a member of Chandra-Aditya Kula in the Sinnamanur copper plates. It was initially assumed by K. A. N. Sastri  and E. P. N. K. Pillai that the Vira Narayana had married a Chera Perumal princess of Kerala. Reciprocal marriage alliances between the Chera Perumals and the Cholas are also recorded in several inscriptions (see Kizhan Adigal).

The Kongu country was conquered by the Cholas under Aditya I in the last years of the 9th century AD (this campaign probably involved battles between Aditya I and Parantaka Vira Narayana). The Pandyas were eventually defeated in the "great battle" of Sripurambiyam (c. 885 AD).

When the Chola king Parantaka I conquered the Pandyas in 910 AD, the Cheras might have allowed to have rule parts of Kongu country (the fate of the Kongu Chera country, then ruled by Kongu Cheras, upon the fall of Madurai is not known). Pandya king Rajasimha II, who was defeated by Parantaka I, is known to have found asylum in the Chera country or Kerala (c. 920 AD). Chola king Sundara (c. 956 – c. 973 AD) had a Chera or Kerala princess among his queens.

Chola influence in Kongu country 
Kongu Chera country was subsequently conquered by the Cholas (late 10th-early 11 centuries). Amara Bhujanga Deva, one of the princes defeated by Chola king Rajaraja (Tiruvalangadu Grant), was probably a Pandya or a Kongu Chera prince. There are records of a king named Vira Kerala Amara Bhujanga Deva from Kongu region. Chola king Rajadhiraja is known for defeating certain Vira Kerala, one of the so-called "thennavar muvar", and trampling him to death by his war elephant. This royal was probably a Kongu-Chera of Chandra-Aditya Kula or a Pandya prince (son of a Pandya and a Kongu Chera princess). Vira Kerala was previously considered as a Chera Perumal king (K. A. N. Sastri and E. P. N. K. Pillai).

A line of independent rulers known as "Kongu Cholas" (with Chola titles) ruled the Kongu country in c. 13th century AD. These were probably members of a collateral branch of the Kongu Cheras (or the descendants of Chola "viceroys" to the Kongu country).

Kongu Chera genealogy 
Several stone and copper inscriptions of the Kongu Cheras, probably Chola vassals, dated by palaeography to 9th – 11th centuries AD, are found in places like Vellalur, Namakkal, Pazhani, Perur, Dharmapuram, Erode and Tirukkannapuram.  They are generally described in inscriptions as members of Chandra-Aditya Kula (the Luni-Solar Race).

Kongu Chera coins 
Unlike the Chera Perumals of the west coast, the Kongu Cheras are known for their signature coins.

A silver coin with Nagari legend "sri vira keralasya" (11th–12th centuries AD) in British Museum is generally attributed to Kongu Cheras. Another coin known as "anai achu" (the elephant mould"), with the bow and arrow symbol, can also be a Kongu Chera product. The anai achu coin was current in western Tamil Nadu and to some extent in Kerala in the 12th–13th centuries AD.

References 

Chera dynasty
Dynasties of India
Hindu dynasties
Tamil monarchs
Empires and kingdoms of India
History of Tamil Nadu
Tamil history
Karur